John Torstensson (5 October 1896 – 10 August 1972) was a Swedish footballer who played as a defender. He was also part of Sweden's squad for the football tournament at the 1920 Summer Olympics, but he did not play in any matches.

References

Association football defenders
Swedish footballers
Allsvenskan players
Malmö FF players
1896 births
1972 deaths